Jonathon Gary Frank Mirasty (born June 4, 1982) is a Cree native Canadian ice hockey player who has played in multiple professional leagues including the WHL, KHL, and AHL. Nicknamed "Nasty" by both teammates and fans, Mirasty developed a cult following throughout his career due to his Mohawk hairstyle and his laughing during his fights. Mirasty finished the 2010-11 regular season with the Fort Wayne Komets. However, he was left off the playoff roster. Mirasty, who weighs 220 pounds and stands five-foot-ten, had originally planned on retiring from hockey in 2006. After playing low-level pro-hockey, Mirasty was soon given a chance to play for the Syracuse Crunch of the AHL, a minor-league affiliate of the Columbus Blue Jackets, where he appeared in a number of NHL exhibition games while continuing to compete for the minor league team at the times. Mirasty currently plays for Binghamton Black Bears of the FPHL.

He made his acting debut as a hockey player in the television series Shoresy.

MMA
Mirasty made his professional MMA debut against Sebastian Gauthier, losing in the first round. In his youth Mirasty competed in boxing and was provincial and golden gloves champion in 1998 and 1999.

Personal life
Mirasty, a Cree Indian, is a distant cousin of teammate Jeremy Yablonski. Mirasty is married to Janessa Mirasty and has two children, older son Tristan and younger daughter Ava.

When not playing hockey, or coaching his son, Mirasty spends time breaking and training horses on his ranch in Meadow Lake.

After playing over nine seasons professionally, Mirasty saw a future in business and opened up his town's first Tim Hortons within a 90-mile radius. However, four months into the operation Mirasty and his family were forced to sell due to personal health problems Mirasty was facing.

References

External links
 ESPN.com - E-ticket: Men Who Love Goons

1982 births
Bakersfield Condors (1998–2015) players
Barys Nur-Sultan players
Danbury Trashers players
Elmira Jackals (ECHL) players
First Nations sportspeople
Fort Wayne Komets players
Greenville Grrrowl players
Ice hockey people from Saskatchewan
Living people
Moose Jaw Warriors players
Prince Albert Raiders players
OCN Blizzard players
Sportspeople from Meadow Lake, Saskatchewan
Syracuse Crunch players
Tri-City Americans players
HC Vityaz players
Canadian ice hockey left wingers